Kerins O'Rahilly's are a Gaelic Athletic Association club from Tralee, County Kerry, Ireland. They are based in the Strand Road area of the town. They are in Division 1 of the county league which they won in 2006, and compete in the County Championship.

History
The club was founded in 1927 and was named for The O'Rahilly (1875–1916), a Kerryman killed in the Easter Rising, and Charlie Kerins (1918–1944) of the later IRA, executed during the Second World War.

Notable players

Achievements
 Kerry Senior Football Championship Winners (6) 1933, 1939, 1953, 1954, 1957, 2002
 Munster Senior Club Football Championship Winners (1) 2022
 Kerry Club Football Championship Winners (3) 2009, 2010, 2022
 Kerry County League Div 1: Winners (4) 1985, 1999, 2006, 2013 
 Kerry Under-21 Football Championship: Winners (1) 2015
 Kerry Under 21 Club Championship Winners (2) 2013, 2009
 Kerry Minor Football Championship Winners (1) 2006
 Kerry Minor County League Division 1 Winners (2) 2007, 2008

References

External links
Official Kerins O'Rahilly's GAA Club website

Gaelic games clubs in County Kerry
Gaelic football clubs in County Kerry
Sport in Tralee